Natasha Zvereva defeated Leila Meskhi in the final, 2–6, 6–2, 9–7 to win the girls' singles tennis title at the 1986 Wimbledon Championships.

Seeds

  Claudia Porwik (first round)
  Patricia Tarabini (second round)
  Nicole Provis (second round)
  Wiltrud Probst (quarterfinals)
  Michelle Jaggard (semifinals)
  Dinky van Rensburg (third round)
  Hellas ter Riet (third round)
  Jana Novotná (third round)
  Emmanuelle Derly (second round)
  Cécile Calmette (second round)
  Bettina Fulco (third round)
  Gisele Miró (semifinals)
  Gisele Faria (second round)
  Ann Devries (quarterfinals)
  Rona Daniels (first round)
  Gabriela Mosca (second round)

Draw

Finals

Top half

Section 1

Section 2

Bottom half

Section 3

Section 4

References

External links

Girls' Singles
Wimbledon Championship by year – Girls' singles